Klaf or Qelaf is the designation given a particular piece of skin. The Talmudic definition includes both the form of the skin and the way it is processed, in particular, that it must be tanned. Since the innovative ruling of Rabbeinu Tam (12th century Tosafist) it is primarily used to refer to parchment or vellum. It is one of the materials upon which a  writes certain Jewish liturgical and ritual documents.

Description
 is a specially prepared, tanned, split skin of a kosher animalgoat, cattle, or deer. The rabbinic scholars are divided upon which is the inner and which is the outer of the two halves. Maimonides is of the opinion that  was the inner layer and that  was the outer layer 
The Shulchan Aruch rules in the reverse that  was the outer layer and that  was the inner layer

Preparation
The legally required method of cleaning and preparing  has been altered over the centuries. Nowadays, most processors dip the skins in clear water for two days and then soak them in limewater for nine days to remove the hair. When it is a hairless surface, the scribe stretches it on a wooden drying frame and scrapes it until it is dry. Creases are ironed out with presses. Then it is sanded until it becomes a flat, smooth sheet fit for writing. The reasons for the change in this process are lengthy and controversial. Today, a few Jewish scribes still prepare  in precise accordance with the Jewish Law.

Some parchment (usually poor quality) is smeared with log, a chalky substance, to make it whiter.  Occasionally this is only done on the reverse. Some scribes object to the use of log as it forms a barrier between the ink and the parchment.

Uses

Intent
If necessary, the scribe should state that he is preparing for the sake of a  but that he may change his mind if he wishes. Some Rabbinic scholars hold that , a non-Jew may prepare it. However, a Jew must stand over him, directing him in his work and stating verbally that the preparation is for the sake of heaven.

Current production
Today there is a large amount of  processed under rabbinical supervision, and the variety, quality, and quantity are increasing.

See also 
 Ktav Stam
 Kulmus

References

External links
 Hebrewbooks.org: The Tefillin Manual

Hebrew words and phrases in Jewish law
Jewish law and rituals
Uses of leather in Judaism
Writing media